Carcha undulatalis is a species of snout moth in the genus Carcha. It was described by Hans Georg Amsel in 1956 and is known from Venezuela.

References

Moths described in 1956
Chrysauginae